Vinicius de Oliveira Fabrao (born March 26, 1989, in Londrina), better known as Vinicius Fabbron, is a Brazilian footballer who currently plays for Korean club Pocheon.

Career
Vinicius began his career with Associação Portuguesa Londrinense and joined on 12 September 2007 in the Primavera team of AC Milan who played a half year. He signed than in January 2008 for the Romanian club FC Ceahlăul Piatra Neamţ.

References

External links

1989 births
Living people
Brazilian footballers
Brazilian expatriate sportspeople in Romania
Association football forwards
Brazilian expatriate sportspeople in Italy
Brazilian expatriate sportspeople in Moldova
Brazilian expatriate sportspeople in South Korea
Liga I players
Liga II players
Moldovan Super Liga players
FC Zimbru Chișinău players
Londrina Esporte Clube players
Brazilian expatriate footballers
A.C. Milan players
Expatriate footballers in Italy
Expatriate footballers in Moldova
Expatriate footballers in South Korea
CSM Ceahlăul Piatra Neamț players
Expatriate footballers in Romania
Associação Portuguesa Londrinense players
Sportspeople from Londrina